Dr Margaret Colquhoun (née Kelsey) was born 10 May 1947 in Yorkshire, England. She died 3 August 2017 at the age of 70. Colquhoun was an evolutionary biologist who used Goethean scientific methodology to research and promote education in natural sciences, founding The Life Science Trust in Southeast Scotland in 1992.

Education 
Colquhoun began her time at the University of Edinburgh studying Zoology and Genetics with Agricultural Science. She later completed her PhD in evolutionary biology in 1978 at the University of Edinburgh.

Continuing her education and work in the field beyond her PhD, Colquhoun was a proponent of Goethean science methodology, which she studied at the Carl Gustave Carus Institute (Oschelbronn, Germany) and the Natural Science Section (Dornach, Switzerland).

Notable work 
Before achieving her own PhD at the University of Edinburgh, Colquhoun worked as a research associate under C. H. Waddington looking into population genetics.

To continue her work in Goethean science and the promotion of holistic science and environmental issues, Colquhoun founded an educational charity, The Life Science Trust, in 1992. When The Trust purchased a plot of land in the Lammermuir hills in 1996, she directed the Pishwanton Project, which Colquhoun described as: "A pioneer experiment in the sustainable and therapeutic integration of a variety of activities that might normally be seen as mutually exclusive, for example agriculture, horticulture, medicinal plant cultivation, ecological conservation and research, education, the arts, community living and business. The Pishwanton Project is thus an innovative, land-based project which provides a pioneer focus for sustainability in the 21st century." Pishwanton Wood educates visitors and promotes conservation to this day.

Colquhoun also wrote New Eyes for Plants: A Workbook for Observing and Drawing Plants in 1996.

Outside of the world of academia, Colquhoun was a founder of the Helios Fountain, a gift shop in the Edinburgh Grassmarket which closed in 2015 after several decades of business.

Personal life 
Colquhoun married David Bathgate, an Edinburgh mountaineer, in 1970 at the age of 23. The couple divorced in 1977.

References 

1947 births
2017 deaths
British evolutionary biologists
Alumni of the University of Edinburgh